The Öregrund archipelago is the archipelago of Uppsala County in Sweden. It is located in the Baltic Sea and consists of 9,722 islands. The Öregrund archipelago is connected to the Stockholm archipelago in the south.

Notes

References 
 Öregrunds skärgård (in Swedish)

Landforms of Uppsala County
Archipelagoes of Sweden